Baba Bakala is a historical town and tehsil in the Amritsar district in Punjab, India. It is known as the location of Gurdwara Baba Bakala Sahib.

History

Baba Bakala Sahib is closely associated with the ninth guru of the Sikhs, Guru Tegh Bahadur. The guru is said to have meditated here for 26 years, 9 months and 13 days. There is a Gurdwara at the site commemorating this.

Baba Bakala Sahib was originally known as Bakkan-Wala (meaning 'Town of the Deer' in Persian) however over time this was shortened to Bakala. The town was originally a mound, where deer were found grazing.

Before passing away in Delhi, the guru at the time, Guru Har Krishan uttered "Baba Bakale" which the Sikhs at the time interpreted as meaning that the guru's successor was to be found at the town of Bakala, close to Amritsar. Once the next guru was found, the phrase "Baba Bakale" evolved into the official name of the town, Baba Bakala sahib.

Geography

The town is located only 43 km (26.7 miles) away from the Golden Temple in the city of Amritsar, 46.5 km (28.9 miles) northwest of Jalandhar and 193 km (120.5 miles) northwest of the state's capital of Chandigarh.

Demographics

According to the 2011 census of India, the population of Baba Bakala is 8946. There are 1,834 households, 4,697 males and 4,249 females.
Thus the corresponding sex ratio is 905 women per 1000 men.

Religion

Sikhism is the most prominent religion of the town. Other minorities includes Hinduism and Jainism. Bhullar Jatts and Shukla Pandits were the original inhabitants of the town when it was founded as a village. There were few Muslim households, who migrated elsewhere during the 1947 Partition of India

Politics
The city is part of the Baba Bakala Assembly Constituency.

References

Villages in Amritsar district